Ozora is an unincorporated community and census-designated place located in Beauvais Township in Sainte Genevieve County, Missouri, United States. Ozora is located approximately eight miles south of Sainte Genevieve.

Etymology

Ozora is located approximately one-quarter of a mile from the earlier settlement of New Bremen, which had been settled by Germans and named after the port they had sailed from. In 1901, three names were submitted: New Bremen (because of the nearby community), Ida and Ozark. Since there was already an Ozark post office in Christian County, the name Ozora was coined from the word Ozark.

Community 

Ozora is home to the Sacred Heart Catholic Church and a Catholic elementary school.

Demographics

2010 census 

As of the census of 2010, there were 183 people, made up of 100 males (54.64%) and 83 females (45.36%). The population density was 29.9 per square mile.
The racial makeup of the village was 97.81% White, 1.64% American Indian and Alaska native, and 0.55% from other races.

References 

Census-designated places in Missouri
Unincorporated communities in Ste. Genevieve County, Missouri
Unincorporated communities in Missouri
Census-designated places in Ste. Genevieve County, Missouri